Chiappini is an Italian surname. Notable people with the surname include:

Alessandro Chiappini (born 1969), Italian volleyball coach
Barbara Chiappini (born 1974), Italian model and actress
Izabella Chiappini (born 1995), Brazilian water polo player
Maria Stella Wynn, Lady Newborough (née Chiappini; 1773–1843), Italian-born memoirist, Grand Master of Freemasonry, self-styled legitimate daughter of Louis Philippe II 
Pietro Chiappini (1915–1988), Italian cyclist

See also 
 Chiappa
 Monte Chiappo, one of the Apennine Mountains in Italy

Italian-language surnames